The 1996 WAFL season was the 112th season of the West Australian Football League in its various incarnations.

It saw the league at a crisis point with attendances decimated by the rise of the Eagles and newly formed Dockers of the AFL. With serious financial problems for a number of clubs, especially Perth and Swan Districts but also Claremont, East Perth and West Perth, the league intensely debated whether to expand or contract the competition.

On the field, 1996 was notable for the decline of 1995 minor premiers Subiaco, who with the decline of top goalkicker Jason Heatley and the loss of other key players to the AFL, declined by thirteen wins, the largest in WAFL history since Claremont after the loss of Graham Moss to  fell from only three losses in 1972 to only four wins in 1973. In the process, the Lions suffered a number of spectacular losses. In contrast, East Perth, after eleven years in the doldrums when they had won only eighty and drawn one of 236 games, rose under the coaching of former  defender Kevin Worthington to their first minor premiership since 1976 and despite lack of experience, nearly beat Claremont in a thrilling Grand Final. The Tigers, despite being fifth in 1995, won the Emu Export Cup to be early premiership favourites with the power of their lower grades, and despite some lapses ultimately lived up to that label.

The wettest Perth winter since 1974 led to some notable low scoring, with Claremont kicking the second lowest score by an eventual premier team in a major Australian Rules league against Swan Districts and West Perth kicking three or fewer goals in successive games for the first time in 69 open-age seasons.

Home-and-away season

Round 1 (Easter weekend)

Round 2

Round 3

Round 4 (Anzac Day)

Round 5

Round 6

Round 7

Round 8

Round 9 (Foundation Day)

Round 10

Round 11

Round 12

Round 13

Round 14

Round 15

Round 16

Round 17

Round 18

Round 19

Round 20

Round 21

Ladder

Finals

Semi-finals

Preliminary final

Grand Final

Notes
Rushton Park, also known under a sponsorship deal as Bendigo Bank Stadium, has been the home of ninth Westar Rules/WAFL club Peel Thunder since it formed in 1997.

References

External links
Official WAFL website
West Australian Football League (WAFL), 1996

West Australian Football League seasons
WAFL